American City Business Journals, Inc. (ACBJ) is an American newspaper publisher based in Charlotte, North Carolina. ACBJ publishes The Business Journals, which contains local business news for 44 markets in the United States, Hemmings Motor News, Street & Smith's Sports Business Daily, and Inside Lacrosse. The company is owned by Advance Publications. The company receives revenue from display advertising and classified advertising in its weekly newspaper and online advertising on its website and from a subscription business model.

The bizjournals.com website contains local business news from various cities in the United States, along with an archive that contains more than 5 million business news articles published since 1996. As of August 2021, it receives over 3.6 million readers each week.

History
The company was founded in 1982 by Mike Russell with the launch of the Kansas City Business Journal.

In 1985, the company became a public company via an initial public offering and was traded as an over the counter stock.

In 1986, the company acquired the full complement of publications from Business Journal Publications, including the St. Louis Business Journal and several other business journals and legal publications. 

In 1986 Mike Russel acquired ten city business newspapers from Scripps-Howard. Scripps Howard Business Journals was operating ten publications, in Phoenix, Arizona; Los Angeles, San Diego, San Francisco (California); Washington, D.C.; South Florida; Atlanta, Georgia; Dallas-Fort Worth, Houston, (Texas) and Seattle, Washington

Ray Shaw joined the company in 1989 and served as the company's chairman and chief executive officer for 20 years until his death in 2009. Under Ray Shaw's leadership, the company moved its headquarters from Kansas City, Missouri to Charlotte, North Carolina and greatly increased the number of its publications.

In 1995, the company was acquired by Advance Publications for $258.8 million.

In 2001, the company partnered with Microsoft to provide content for bcentral.com.

In 2007, the company acquired Inside Lacrosse.

In 2012, sister company Condé Nast redirected Portfolio.com to the startups page of ACBJ.

In 2020, the company launched a book publishing partnership.

Annual awards
The publication publishes the following annual awards for each city:
 The Business Journal's Forty Under 40 lists the 40 most successful entrepreneurs under the age of 40. It has been published since 1992.

 The Business Journal's Best Places to Work ranks top businesses in local areas for best employee experience. Rankings are determined based on surveys on  leadership, corporate culture, and communications. Different cities can use different methodologies and rank a different number of employers.

List of publications 

 Albany Business Review – Founded 1974 (as Capital District Business Review). Previously known as Capital District Business Review and The Business Review. The Review publishes an annual Book of Lists which, for example, contains ranked lists of local engineering firms, colleges, general contractors, fastest-growing companies, labor unions, law firms, hospitals, tourist attractions, apartment communities, manufacturers, etc.
 Albuquerque Business First
 Atlanta Business Chronicle – Acquired in 1986 with purchase of Scripps Howard Business Journals.
 Austin Business Journal – A member of the Austin Chamber of Commerce, with offices in downtown Austin. Publishes several lists and grants several awards annually, among them being "List of Fastest-Growing Central Texas Neighborhoods", "Best Places to Work Award", and "Fast 50" list of rapidly growing companies.
 Baltimore Business Journal – Acquired in 1986 with purchase of Business Journal Publications Corp.
 Bellingham Business Journal
 Birmingham Business Journal – Founded in 1983 by Michael C. Randle and Tina Verciglio-Savas. Acquired in 1999.
 Boston Business Journal – Founded by Robert Bergenheim and launched on March 2, 1981. The newspaper was originally named "P&L The Boston Business Journal" ("P&L" stood for profit and loss). However, "P&L" was later dropped from the name. Acquired in 1996 with purchase of CityMedia Inc.
 Buffalo Business First
 Charlotte Business Journal
 Chicago Business Journal
 Cincinnati Business Courier – Acquired in 1986 with purchase of Business Journal Publications Corp. Print edition has a circulation of more than 50,000 business owners, professionals and decision makers, and more than 10,000 email subscribers receive a free daily news update.
 Cleveland Business Journal – Launched in May 2020 
 Columbus Business First
 Dallas Business Journal – Acquired in 1986 with purchase of Scripps Howard Business Journals.
 Dayton Business Journal
 Denver Business Journal – Acquired by American City Business Journals in 1989
 Hartford Business Journal' 'HEMMINGS Motor News
 Houston Business Journal – Acquired in 1986 with purchase of Scripps Howard Business Journals. The Houston Business Journal had occupied space in the Park Towers for a period of over 10 years. Offices moved to 5444 Westheimer Road effective November 5, 2012.
 Jacksonville Business Journal – Began publishing in 1985. Publishes annually a Book of Lists, which contains updated, ranked lists on a subjects including largest employers, largest companies, largest law firms, and similar lists.
 Kansas City Business Journal – Co-founded by Michael K. Russell and William Worley in August 1982.
 L.A. Biz – Online only.
 Louisville Business First – Founded in 1984
 Memphis Business Journal – Founded by Ward Archer as Mid-South Business in 1979.
 Milwaukee Business Journal – Acquired in 1996 with purchase of CityMedia Inc.
 Minneapolis / St. Paul Business Journal – Acquired in 1996 with purchase of CityMedia Inc.
 Nashville Business Journal Orlando Business Journal – Gives local awards for Women Who Mean Business
 Pacific Business News – Started by entrepreneur George Mason and former Honolulu Star-Bulletin editor John Ramsey. In 1983, Mason sold the newspaper to ACBJ, though he continued to write a regular column for more than a decade after that.
 Philadelphia Business Journal – Founded in 1982, acquired in 1996 with purchase of CityMedia Inc.
 Phoenix Business Journal- Founded in 1980, Acquired in 1986 with purchase of Scripps Howard Business Journals.
 Pittsburgh Business Times – Founded in 1981, acquired in 1986 with Business Journal Publications Corp. Sold in 1988. Reacquired in 1996 with purchase of CityMedia Inc.
 Portland Business Journal Puget Sound Business Journal – Acquired in 1986 with purchase of Scripps Howard Business Journals In 2010, the newspaper was a finalist for a Pulitzer Prize in Explanatory Reporting for a series of stories about the foreclosure crises and the federal shutdown of Seattle-based Washington Mutual. The stories were reported by staff writers Kirsten Grind and Jeanne Lang Jones, and edited by Managing Editor Alwyn Scott. Congressman Dave Reichert later honored the PSBJ, praising its "inclusive and thorough" reporting as an "invaluable public service".
 Sacramento Business Journal – Acquired in 1996 with purchase of CityMedia Inc.
 St. Louis Business Journal – Established in 1980 with Dan Keough at the helm; acquired in 1986 with purchase of Business Journal Publications by ACBJ.
 San Antonio Business Journal San Francisco Business Journal – Acquired in 1986 with purchase of Scripps Howard Business Journals. In 2008, East Bay Business Times merged with the San Francisco Business Times.
 Silicon Valley / San Jose Business Journal South Florida Business Journal – Founded in 1980 as Miami Business, it changed its name in 1983. Acquired in 1986 with purchase of Scripps Howard Business Journals. 
 Tampa Bay Business Journal – Founded as Tampa Bay Business in 1981, renamed in the late 1990s as The Business Journal Serving Tampa Bay Triad Business Journal Triangle Business Journal Washington Business Journal – Acquired in 1986 with purchase of Scripps Howard Business Journals. 
 Wichita Business Journal''

References

External links
 
 American City Business Journals corporate website
 The Business Journals
 Street & Smith's SportsBusiness Journal
 Hemmings Motor News
 Biz Journals

1990 initial public offerings
1995 mergers and acquisitions
Advance Publications
American corporate subsidiaries
Business newspapers published in the United States
Companies based in Charlotte, North Carolina
Mass media companies established in 1985
Weekly newspapers published in the United States
1982 establishments in the United States